The 1998–99 NBA season was the Knicks’ 52nd season in the National Basketball Association. On March 23, 1998, the owners of all 29 NBA teams voted 27–2 to reopen the league's collective bargaining agreement, seeking changes to the league's salary cap system, and a ceiling on individual player salaries. The National Basketball Players Association (NBPA) opposed to the owners' plan, and wanted raises for players who earned the league's minimum salary. After both sides failed to reach an agreement, the owners called for a lockout, which began on July 1, 1998, putting a hold on all team trades, free agent signings and training camp workouts, and cancelling many NBA regular season and preseason games. Due to the lockout, the NBA All-Star Game, which was scheduled to be played in Philadelphia on February 14, 1999, was also cancelled. However, on January 6, 1999, NBA commissioner David Stern, and NBPA director Billy Hunter finally reached an agreement to end the lockout. The deal was approved by both the players and owners, and was signed on January 20, ending the lockout after 204 days. The regular season began on February 5, and was cut short to just 50 games instead of the regular 82-game schedule.

The Knicks' head coach was Jeff Van Gundy, serving for his third full year. The team played its home games at Madison Square Garden in New York City. To give All-Star center Patrick Ewing more help offensively and defensively, the Knicks acquired controversial All-Star guard Latrell Sprewell from the Golden State Warriors, acquired Marcus Camby from the Toronto Raptors, and signed free agents Kurt Thomas, and three-point specialist Dennis Scott during the off-season. However, Scott was released by the team to free agency after 15 games, and later on signed with the Minnesota Timberwolves. Because of the lockout shortened season, and injuries to Sprewell, who missed 13 games due to a stress fracture in his right heel, and Ewing, who missed 12 games with a knee injury, the Knicks had to build chemistry on the fly, and barely made the playoffs with a 27–23 record, fourth in the Atlantic Division. The Knicks had to win six of its remaining eight games just to qualify.

Ewing led the team with 17.3 points, 9.9 rebounds and 2.6 blocks per game, while Sprewell, who was previously the starting shooting guard in Golden State, played a sixth man role, averaging 16.4 points per game off the bench, and Allan Houston provided the team with 16.3 points per game. In addition, Larry Johnson contributed 12.0 points and 5.8 rebounds per game, while Thomas provided with 8.1 points and 5.7 rebounds per game, and Charlie Ward contributed 7.6 points, 5.4 assists and 2.1 steals per game. Off the bench, Camby averaged 7.2 points, 5.5 rebounds and 1.6 blocks per game, and Chris Childs contributed 6.8 points and 4.0 assists per game.

In the Eastern Conference First Round of the playoffs, the Knicks faced the Miami Heat for the third consecutive year. The Knicks became the second 8th-seeded team in NBA history to defeat the #1 seed, eliminating the top-seeded Heat in five games (one of the five games on one of the biggest shots in Knicks' history by Houston). The Knicks then took down the 4th-seeded Atlanta Hawks in a second round four-game sweep in the Eastern Conference Semi-finals. Camby, who had struggled through most of the regular season, emerged as one of the key players off a deep Knicks bench. Camby's 11 points and 13 rebounds in Game 2 of the Atlanta series proved to be his coming-out party, and the Knicks became the first #8 seed to sweep a playoff series as the team advanced to the Eastern Conference Finals to meet a familiar foe, Reggie Miller and the Indiana Pacers.

However, the Knicks would lose Ewing after Game 2 of the Eastern Conference Finals, which the Knicks lost to the Pacers on the road, 88–86; Ewing had been battling through an Achilles injury, but it was learned that the tendon (which he had played on in Game 2) was partially torn, and he would be forced to miss the rest of the playoffs. The Knicks were rescued by Johnson in Game 3. Standing outside the three-point line with 11.9 seconds left, Johnson held the ball, and then began to dribble. He leaned into Pacers defender Antonio Davis before jumping up. The referee called the foul about a half-second before Johnson released the ball, but it was counted as a continuation shooting foul. The three-point basket and the ensuing free throw gave the Knicks a 92–91 victory. The Knicks would then stamp their ticket to the NBA finals with a 90–82 home win in Game 6, despite losing Johnson to a knee injury in the first half. Led by Houston's 32-point performance and defense against Miller (3–18 shooting), the Knicks closed out the 2nd-seeded Pacers. The Knicks' 27–23 record was the worst for a team to reach the Finals since the Houston Rockets did it with a 40–42 record in 1981. They also became the first, and so far only #8 seed to reach the NBA Finals as of 2022.

In the Finals, the Knicks were halted in five games against the San Antonio Spurs. Completely overmatched by the Spurs' height with Tim Duncan and David Robinson, the Knicks lost at home with a 78–77 loss in Game 5 despite Sprewell's 35 points. For the series, Sprewell averaged 26.0 points per game, and Houston provided with 21.6 points per game. The Knicks defense did not allow any opponent to score more than 96 points against them in their 20 playoff games. Following the season, Herb Williams retired.

The team's season roster has been featured in the basketball game series NBA 2K since the 19th installment NBA 2K18.

Offseason

NBA Draft

Transactions

On 6/25/98: Knicks traded Charles Oakley and Sean Marks to the Toronto Raptors for Marcus Camby.
On 1/18/99: Knicks traded John Starks, Chris Mills and Terry Cummings to the Golden State Warriors for Latrell Sprewell.

Roster

Regular season

Season standings

Record vs. opponents

Schedule

 Feb.
 Feb. 5 	Orlando 93, New York 85 (0-1) 	 	 
 Feb. 7 	Miami 83, New York 79 (0-2)	 	 
 Feb. 10 	New York 101, Washington 88 (1-2) 	 	 
 Feb. 11 	New York 73, Chicago 68 (2-2)	 	 
 Feb. 15 	New York 78, Detroit 69 (3-2)	 	 
 Feb. 16 	New York 95, Toronto 85 (4-2)	 	 
 Feb. 18 	Cleveland 98, New York 74 (4-3)	 	 
 Feb. 19 	New York 78, Philadelphia 67 (5-3)	 	 
 Feb. 21 	New York 79, Chicago 63 (6-3)	 	 
 Feb. 23 	New York 82, New Jersey 74 (7-3) 	 	 
 Feb. 25 	New York 115, Minnesota 113 (8-3)	 	 
 Feb. 26 	Boston 94, New York 80 (8-4) 	 	 
 Feb. 28 	Detroit 89, New York 68 (8-5)	 	 
  
 Mar.
 Mar. 1 	New York 85, Cleveland 78 (9-5)	 	 
 Mar. 2 	Miami 85, New York 84 (9-6)	 	 
 Mar. 5 	Milwaukee 88, New York 87 (9-7)	 	 
 Mar. 7 	New York 97, New Jersey 86 (10-7)	 	 
 Mar. 9 	Milwaukee 87, New York 86 (10-8)	 	 
 Mar. 11 	New York 98, Washington 86 (11-8)	 	 
 Mar. 12 	Chicago 76, New York 63 (11-9)	 	 
 Mar. 14 	New York 94, Charlotte 86 (12-9) 	 	 
 Mar. 15 	New York 108, Milwaukee 102 (13-9) 	 	 
 Mar. 16 	New York 113, Los Angeles Clippers 89 (14-9)	 	 
 Mar. 18 	Orlando 86, New York 78 (14-10)	 	 
 Mar. 20 	New York 96, Boston 78 (15-10)	 	 
 Mar. 21 	Toronto 85, New York 81 (15-11)	 	 
 Mar. 22 	Atlanta 80, New York 71 (15-12) 	 	 
 Mar. 24 	Sacramento 92, New York 91 (15-13) 	 	 
 Mar. 26 	New York 94, Phoenix 87 (16-13)	 	 
 Mar. 28 	Los Angeles Lakers 99, New York 91 (16-14) 	 	 
 Mar. 30 	New York 94, Indiana 93 (17-14)	 	 
  
 Apr.
 Apr. 1 	New York 78, Cleveland 74 (18-14) 	 	 
 Apr. 4 	Indiana 108, New York 95 (18-15) 	 	 
 Apr. 6 	Orlando 81, New York 72 (18-16)	 	 
 Apr. 7 	Charlotte 106, New York 82 (18-17)	 	 
 Apr. 9 	New York 86, Atlanta 78 (19-17)	 	 
 Apr. 11 	New York 93, New Jersey 78 (20-17) 	 	 
 Apr. 13 	New York 91, Philadelphia 72 (21-17)	 	 
 Apr. 14 	Washington 95, New York 89 (21-18)	 	 
 Apr. 16 	Detroit 80, New York 71 (21-19)	 	 
 Apr. 17 	Toronto 93, New York 90 (21-20) 	 	 
 Apr. 19 	Philadelphia 72, New York 67 (21-21)	 	 
 Apr. 23 	New York 110, Charlotte 105 (22-21) 	 	 
 Apr. 25 	New York 82, Miami 80 (23-21)	 	 
 Apr. 26 	New York 91, Charlotte 84 (24-21)	 	 
 Apr. 28 	Atlanta 76, New York 73 (24-22)	 	 
 Apr. 29 	New York 85, Philadelphia 70 (25-22) 	 	 
  
 May
 May 2 		Indiana 94, New York 71 (25-23)	 	 
 May 3 		New York 95, Boston 88 (26-23) 	 	 
 May 5 		New York 101, Miami 88 (27-23)

Playoffs

|- align="center" bgcolor="#ccffcc"
| 1
| May 8
| @ Miami
| W 95–75
| Houston, Sprewell (22)
| Patrick Ewing (15)
| Charlie Ward (6)
| Miami Arena15,036
| 1–0
|- align="center" bgcolor="#ffcccc"
| 2
| May 10
| @ Miami
| L 73–83
| Patrick Ewing (16)
| Patrick Ewing (15)
| Charlie Ward (5)
| Miami Arena15,200
| 1–1
|- align="center" bgcolor="#ccffcc"
| 3
| May 12
| Miami
| W 97–73
| Latrell Sprewell (20)
| Marcus Camby (9)
| Charlie Ward (4)
| Madison Square Garden19,763
| 2–1
|- align="center" bgcolor="#ffcccc"
| 4
| May 14
| Miami
| L 72–87
| Houston, Ward (12)
| Larry Johnson (12)
| Charlie Ward (4)
| Madison Square Garden19,763
| 2–2
|- align="center" bgcolor="#ccffcc"
| 5
| May 16
| @ Miami
| W 78–77
| Patrick Ewing (22)
| Patrick Ewing (11)
| three players tied (3)
| Miami Arena14,985
| 3–2
|-

|- align="center" bgcolor="#ccffcc"
| 1
| May 18
| @ Atlanta
| W 100–92
| Allan Houston (34)
| Chris Dudley (9)
| Charlie Ward (7)
| Georgia Dome18,513
| 1–0
|- align="center" bgcolor="#ccffcc"
| 2
| May 20
| @ Atlanta
| W 77–70
| Latrell Sprewell (31)
| Marcus Camby (13)
| Chris Childs (5)
| Georgia Dome22,558
| 2–0
|- align="center" bgcolor="#ccffcc"
| 3
| May 23
| Atlanta
| W 90–78
| Houston, Sprewell (17)
| Chris Dudley (12)
| Chris Childs (6)
| Madison Square Garden19,763
| 3–0
|- align="center" bgcolor="#ccffcc"
| 4
| May 24
| Atlanta
| W 79–66
| Allan Houston (19)
| Patrick Ewing (9)
| Charlie Ward (6)
| Madison Square Garden19,763
| 4–0
|-

|- align="center" bgcolor="#ccffcc"
| 1
| May 30
| @ Indiana
| W 93–90
| Allan Houston (19)
| Patrick Ewing (10)
| Childs, Ward (5)
| Market Square Arena16,575
| 1–0
|- align="center" bgcolor="#ffcccc"
| 2
| June 1
| @ Indiana
| L 86–88
| Larry Johnson (22)
| Marcus Camby (13)
| three players tied (3)
| Market Square Arena16,586
| 1–1
|- align="center" bgcolor="#ccffcc"
| 3
| June 5
| Indiana
| W 92–91
| Larry Johnson (26)
| Marcus Camby (11)
| Chris Childs (10)
| Madison Square Garden19,763
| 2–1
|- align="center" bgcolor="#ffcccc"
| 4
| June 7
| Indiana
| L 78–90
| Marcus Camby (18)
| Marcus Camby (14)
| Chris Childs (8)
| Madison Square Garden19,763
| 2–2
|- align="center" bgcolor="#ccffcc"
| 5
| June 9
| @ Indiana
| W 101–94
| Latrell Sprewell (29)
| Marcus Camby (13)
| Chris Childs (7)
| Market Square Arena16,541
| 3–2
|- align="center" bgcolor="#ccffcc"
| 6
| June 11
| Indiana
| W 90–82
| Allan Houston (32)
| Marcus Camby (9)
| Chris Childs (4)
| Madison Square Garden19,763
| 4–2
|-

|- align="center" bgcolor="#ffcccc"
| 1
| June 16
| @ San Antonio
| L 77–89
| Houston, Sprewell (19)
| Kurt Thomas (16)
| three players tied (3)
| Alamodome39,514
| 0–1
|- align="center" bgcolor="#ffcccc"
| 2
| June 18
| @ San Antonio
| L 67–80
| Latrell Sprewell (26)
| Marcus Camby (11)
| Charlie Ward (3)
| Alamodome39,554
| 0–2
|- align="center" bgcolor="#ccffcc"
| 3
| June 21
| San Antonio
| W 89–81
| Allan Houston (34)
| Kurt Thomas (10)
| Latrell Sprewell (5)
| Madison Square Garden19,763
| 1–2
|- align="center" bgcolor="#ffcccc"
| 4
| June 23
| San Antonio
| L 89–96
| Latrell Sprewell (26)
| Marcus Camby (13)
| Charlie Ward (8)
| Madison Square Garden19,763
| 1–3
|- align="center" bgcolor="#ffcccc"
| 5
| June 25
| San Antonio
| L 77–78
| Latrell Sprewell (35)
| Latrell Sprewell (10)
| Allan Houston (5)
| Madison Square Garden19,763
| 1–4
|-

Player statistics

NOTE: Please write players statistics in alphabetical order by last name.

Season

Playoffs

Awards and records

Transactions

See also
1998–99 NBA season
1999 NBA Finals
1999 NBA Playoffs

References

 Knicks on Database Basketball
 Knicks on Basketball Reference

External links

New York Knicks seasons
Eastern Conference (NBA) championship seasons
New York Knicks
New York Knicks
New York Knicks
1990s in Manhattan
Madison Square Garden